{{Taxobox
| fossil_range = 
| image = Rumina decollata.jpg
| image_caption = A live individual of the decollate snail, Rumina decollata
| regnum = Animalia
| phylum = Mollusca
| classis = Gastropoda
| unranked_superfamilia = clade Heterobranchia
clade Euthyneuraclade Panpulmonata
clade Eupulmonata
clade Stylommatophora
informal group Sigmurethra
| superfamilia = Achatinoidea
| familia = Achatinidae
| subfamilia = Subulininae
| subfamilia_authority = P. Fischer & Crosse, 1877<ref>Fischer P. & Crosse (1877). Mission scientifique au Mexique et dans l'Amérique Centrale. Recherches zoologiques (7)1(6): 592.</ref>
| subdivision_ranks = Genera
| subdivision = See text
}}

Subulininae is a subfamily of small tropical air-breathing land snails, terrestrial pulmonate gastropod mollusks in the family Achatinidae.

Distribution 
Worldwide.

 Anatomy 
In this subfamily, the number of haploid chromosomes lies between 26 and 35 (according to the values in this table).

 Genera 
Genera in the subfamily Subulininae include:
 Allopeas H. B. Baker, 1935
 Beckianum Baker, 1961
 Curvella Chaper, 1885
 Dysopeas Baker, 1927
 Euonyma Melvill & Ponsonby, 1896
 Hypolysia Melvill & Ponsonby, 1901
 Lamellaxis Strebel & Pfeffer, 1882
 Leptinaria Beck, 1837
 Leptopeas Baker, 1927
 Micropeas Connolly, 1923
 Neoglessula Pilsbry, 1909
Opeas Albers, 1850
 Paropeas Pilsbry, 1906Naggs F. (1994). "The reproductive anatomy of Paropeas achatinaceum and a new concept of Paropeas (Pulmonata: Achatinoidea: Subulinidae)". Journal of Molluscan Studies 60(2): 175-191. .
 Pelatrinia Pilsbry, 1907
 Prosopeas Mörch, 1876
 Pseudoglessula Boettger, 1892
 Pseudopeas Putzeys, 1899
 Striosubulina Thiele, 1933
 Subulina Beck, 1837 - type genus of the subfamily Subulininae
 Vegrandinia Salvador, Cunha & Simone, 2013
 Zootecus Westerlund, 1887

 References 

 Further reading 
 Schileyko A. A. (1999). "Treatise on Recent Terrestrial Pulmonate Molluscs. Part 4 Draparnaudiidae, Caryodidae, Macrocyclidae, Acavidae, Clavatoridae, Dorcasiidae, Sculptariidae, Corillidae, Plectopylidae, Megalobulimidae, Strophocheilidae, Cerionidae, Achatinidae, Subulinidae, Glessulidae, Micractaeonidae, Ferrussaciidae". In: Ruthenica.'', Supplement, 2(4): 435–564, Moscow, ISSN 0136-0027.
 Bank, R. (2017). Classification of the Recent terrestrial Gastropoda of the World. Last update: 16 July 2017

External links